{|
{{Infobox ship image
|Ship image=L'Oiseau (1755) en 1762 (cropped).jpg
|Ship caption=LOiseau in 1762
}}

|}Oiseau''' was a 26-gun frigate of the French Navy.

 Career 
In 1758, Oiseau made a journey from Toulon to Cartagena, and back, under Sagui Des Tourès. Later that year, Lieutenant Moriès-Castellet took command of Oiseau. In September 1759, she captured the British merchantman Prince of Wales, and brought her back to Toulon.

From 25 November 1761 to 11 April 1762, she cruised the Eastern Mediterranean under Lieutenant Barras de Saint-Laurent.

In 1762, she was part of the squadron under Bompard. On 23 October, she was captured by HMS Brune. He captain, Raymond de Modène, had an arm shot off.

Sources and references

Citations

Bibliography
 
 

Frigates of the French Navy
Ships built in France
1757 ships